Bud Shank Plays Tenor is an album by saxophonist Bud Shank recorded in late 1957 for the Pacific Jazz label.

Reception

In a review for AllMusic, Jason Ankeney wrote: "the leap to tenor doesn't dramatically impact his overall sound and style, it does add soul and depth to his lyrical solos".

Track listing
 "Thou Swell" (Richard Rodgers, Lorenz Hart) - 6:40
 "Tenderly" (Walter Gross, Jack Lawrence) - 7:50
 "Over the Rainbow" (Harold Arlen, Yip Harburg) - 4:21
 "Long Ago (and Far Away)" (Ralph Rainger, Leo Robin) - 4:51
 "I Never Knew" (Ted Fio Rito, Sammy Kahn) - 6:31
 "All the Things You Are" (Oscar Hammerstein II, Jerome Kern) - 4:52
 "Body and Soul" (Johnny Green, Edward Heyman, Robert Sour, Frank Eyton) - 5:09
 "Blue Lou" (Irving Mills, Edgar Sampson) - 5:45

Personnel 
Bud Shank - tenor saxophone
Claude Williamson - piano
Don Prell - bass
Chuck Flores - drums

References 

1960 albums
Pacific Jazz Records albums
Bud Shank albums

Albums recorded at Capitol Studios